Erich Schellow (1915–1995) was a German stage, film and television actor.  In the late 1960s he portrayed Sherlock Holmes in a series of adaptations of Arthur Conan Doyle's stories for German television, alongside Paul Edwin Roth as Dr. Watson.

Filmography

References

Bibliography
 Goble, Alan. The Complete Index to Literary Sources in Film. Walter de Gruyter, 1999.

External links

1915 births
1995 deaths
German male stage actors
German male television actors
German male film actors
Male actors from Berlin
Officers Crosses of the Order of Merit of the Federal Republic of Germany